Årvoll is a residential community situated in the Bjerke district of Oslo, Norway. It was here that anti-Nazi activists Viggo Hansteen and Rolf Wickstrøm – the first two Norwegians to be executed by the Nazis during the five-year German occupation of Norway – lost their lives on September 10, 1941.

Name
Årvoll takes its name from the ancient Årvoll farm, which still stands in the center of today's community. Orravellir (the name's earlier Norse form) meant "black grouse fields".

Buildings and amenities
Årvoll is made up of a mix of four-floor apartment buildings, terraced housing, and maisonettes. It has a small shopping center containing a post office, doctors' offices, pharmacy, grocery, florist, and a small café. 
There is extensive access to public transportation, and the center of Oslo can be reached in 15 minutes or less by bus, tram, or bicycle.

The community's children attend Årvoll School, which was opened in 1955. Tonsen Church is located in Årvoll. The local multi-sports team is Årvoll IL.

Årvoll is surrounded by a large expanse of forest including many kilometers of marked cross country ski trails, and is adjacent to Grefsenkollen, a hill affording views of the city, together with walking trails, a small ski area with t-bar lift, and a small pond named Trollvann.

References

Neighbourhoods of Oslo